A Sailor's Guide to Earth is the third studio album by American country music singer-songwriter Sturgill Simpson. It was announced on March 3, 2016, with the release of the single "Brace for Impact (Live a Little)". The album was released on April 15, 2016, and won Best Country Album at the 59th Grammy Awards; it was also nominated for Album of the Year.

Background 
Prior to the album's announcement, Simpson stated in an interview with GQ that "what's next is already finished... Quite honestly, I need about six months at home with my family." On March 3, 2016, Simpson released "Brace for Impact (Live a Little)" on YouTube and his website; the next day he released the nine-song track list of A Sailor's Guide to Earth. A week later, he published the music video for "Brace for Impact", which was directed by Matt Mahurin and contains the Grim Reaper, a hot rod coffin and sailboats. On March 24, 2016, Simpson released his cover of Nirvana's "In Bloom" along with its music video, also directed by Matt Mahurin. Simpson said, "I wanted to make a very beautiful and pure homage to Kurt [Cobain]." Streaming of the album became available on April 7, 2016, on NPR's official website.

The song "Oh Sarah" was previously recorded by Simpson's former band Sunday Valley and appeared on their only full-length album, To the Wind and On To Heaven, in 2011.

Reception

A Sailor's Guide to Earth received widespread critical acclaim upon its release. At Metacritic, which assigns a normalized rating out of 100 to reviews from music critics, the album has received an average score of 86, indicating "universal acclaim", based on 19 reviews.

The album debuted at No. 3 on the Billboard 200, and No. 1 on the Top Country Albums chart, selling 52,000 copies (55,000 units when tracks and streams are included) in its first week.  The album sold a further 13,400 copies in the second week.  The album has sold 217,900 copies in the US as of October 2017.

Following his Grammy win, Simpson saw a 346% increase in streaming on Spotify.

Accolades

Track listing

Personnel

Arthur Cook – cello
Jefferson Crow – piano, Wurlitzer
Jonathan Dinklage – violin
Dan Dugmore – pedal steel guitar
Robert Emmett – keyboards, moog synthesizer, organ, synthesizer, background vocals, Wurlitzer
David Ferguson – engineer, mixing
Clark Gayton – trombone
David Guy – flugelhorn, trumpet
Ian Hendrickson-Smith – alto saxophone, baritone saxophone, tenor saxophone
Laur Joamets – electric guitar, slide guitar
Whitney LaGrange – violin
Miles Miller – drums, background vocals
Dave Roe – bass guitar
Sturgill Simpson – 12-string guitar, acoustic guitar, moog synthesizer, synthesizer, lead vocals, background vocals
Neal Sugarman – tenor saxophone
Dougie Wilkinson – bagpipes
Garo Yellin – cello
Ebonie Smith – assistant engineer

Charts

Weekly charts

Year-end charts

References

2016 albums
Sturgill Simpson albums
Atlantic Records albums
Grammy Award for Best Country Album